Brittany Smith, better known by her stage name Matisse, is an American singer, songwriter, actress, and model. She was best known for being part of the duo Brit & Alex (with her twin sister Alex) until their breakup in 2009. Matisse was signed to Jive Records. On October 7, 2011, labels such as J Records and Arista were sold to Sony's Flagship Label and all artists such as P!nk and Avril Lavigne were merged to sign to RCA Records and other affiliated Sony Music Labels. Matisse was merged to sign to RCA as of 2011; she is currently with Interscope, but no longer with the now-defunct Jive Records.

Career
Smith began appearing on TV at six months of age on One Life to Live and by the age of 15 she was a popular spokesmodel for the successful hair care brand John Frieda and signed to The Ford Agency. During this tenure she and identical twin sister Alexia formed the pop duo Brit & Alex, where they became famous for appearing in TV commercials for John Freida's Sheer Blonde line (where they would be known to fans as "The Sheer Blonde Twins") and later signed with Interscope Records. They also went to England in the hopes of establishing a musical career there, but would achieve little success, having reached number 75 on the UK Singles Chart with "Let It Go" in 2008.

After the duo broke up in 2009 and due to Alex's decision to go to college, Brittany continued with her singing and acting career, signing with Jive Records and recording under the name Matisse, naming herself after the famous painter. And like the famous namesake, Matisse wants to follow her path. "Over the years people have tried to make me into something I'm not," Matisse says, "but I'm not interested in being the next 'so and so' or compromising myself to be a one hit wonder.  I want to make music that I like and that I can be proud of."

Music
In 2010, her first single "Better Than Her", written and produced by Kevin Rudolf and Jacob Kasher, reached number one on Billboard's Hot Dance Airplay chart. She is still working on a full-length LP that was originally to be released sometime in 2011.

In July 2011, Matisse released a medley of Rihanna songs on YouTube. The video was produced by Kurt Hugo Schneider.

Discography

Albums
2013: TBA

Singles

Filmography
1991 : Dynasty: The Reunion (TV miniseries) .... Lauren Colby
1994, 1997 : Renegade (TV series) .... Amelia / Charlie Philips (2 episodes)
1994–95 : Empty Nest (TV series) .... Shanna (2 episodes)
1995 : A Goofy Movie .... Photo Studio Girl (voice)
1996 : Pinocchio's Revenge .... Zoe Garrick
1996 : Something So Right (TV series) .... Girl / Goblin (2 episodes)
1997 : Just in Time .... Lily Bedford
1997 : Beyond Belief: Fact or Fiction (TV series) .... Alice (1 episode)
1997 : Night Man (TV series) .... Maddie Farrell (1 episode)
1997 : Chicago Hope (TV series) .... Jessica Walters (1 episode)
1999 : Treasure of Pirate's Point .... Flame
1999 : Fly Boy .... Janey
1999 : V.I.P. (TV series) .... Amelia Zane (1 episode)

References

External links

1985 births
American women pop singers
American dance musicians
American child actresses
American television actresses
Living people
People from Wilton, Connecticut
Actresses from Connecticut
Singers from Connecticut
21st-century American singers
21st-century American women singers
Identical twin females
Twin musicians
American twins
American expatriates in England